The 1984 Virginia Slims of New Orleans was a women's tennis tournament played on indoor carpet courts at the UNO Lakefront Arena in New Orleans, Louisiana in the United States that was part of the 1984 Virginia Slims World Championship Series. It was the inaugural edition of the tournament and was held from September 24 through September 30, 1984. First-seeded Martina Navratilova won the singles title.

Finals

Singles
 Martina Navratilova defeated  Zina Garrison 6–4, 6–3
 It was Navratilova's 12th singles title of the year and the 98th of her career.

Doubles
 Martina Navratilova /  Pam Shriver defeated  Wendy Turnbull /  Sharon Walsh 6–4, 6–1
 It was Navratilova's 21st title of the year and the 200th of her career. It was Shriver's 12th title of the year and the 61st of her career.

References

External links
 ITF tournament edition details
 Tournament edition datasheet

Virginia Slims of New Orleans
Virginia Slims of New Orleans
1984 in Louisiana
1984 in American tennis